Jawad Rafique Malik (Urdu: جواد رفیق ملک) is a Pakistani civil servant who serves in BPS-22 grade as Industries Secretary of Pakistan. Hailing from Lahore, Malik belongs to the Pakistan Administrative Service and is batchmates with Fawad Hasan Fawad, Rizwan Ahmed, Sikandar Sultan Raja and Shoaib Mir Memon.

Career
Jawad Rafique Malik serves as the Pakistan Secretary of Industries and Production, in office since September 2021. Prior to this, he tenured as Chief Secretary of Punjab from April 2020 to 7 September 2021.

He served as Communications Secretary of Pakistan, in office from July 2019 to April 2020. He has also previously served as Chairman of the National Highway Authority.

Malik was promoted to the rank of Federal Secretary in 2017, and served as Federal Secretary of the National Assembly of Pakistan from April 2017 to December 2017. Malik belongs to the Pakistan Administrative Service and is batchmates with Sikandar Sultan Raja, Fawad Hasan Fawad, Rizwan Ahmed, Allah Dino Khawaja and Zafarullah Khan.

Before serving in the federal government, Malik served in the Government of Punjab as the provincial Health Secretary and Commissioner Lahore.

See also
 Government of Pakistan
 Pakistan Administrative Service
 National Highway Authority

References

Year of birth missing (living people)
Living people
Pakistani civil servants
Government of Pakistan
Pakistani government officials